Clinton Township is a township in Linn County, Iowa.

History
Clinton Township was organized in 1854.

References

Townships in Linn County, Iowa
Townships in Iowa
1854 establishments in Iowa
Populated places established in 1854